Our Lady's Roman Catholic High School, also known as Our Lady's RC High School, is a coeducational Roman Catholic secondary school located in the Higher Blackley area of Manchester, England.

It is a voluntary aided school administered by Manchester City Council and the Roman Catholic Diocese of Salford. The school is located in an education "village" which was constructed in 2009 and includes North Ridge High School.

Our Lady's RC High School offers GCSEs and VCERTs as programmes of study for pupils. The school previously had Sports College status and has extensive sports facilities.

References

External links
Our Lady's RC High School official website

Secondary schools in Manchester
Catholic secondary schools in the Diocese of Salford
Voluntary aided schools in England